The 1951–52 season was Arsenal's 33rd consecutive season in the top division of English football.

Results
Arsenal's score comes first

Legend

Football League First Division

Final League table

FA Cup

Arsenal entered the FA Cup in the third round, in which they were drawn to face Norwich City.

See also

 1951–52 in English football
 List of Arsenal F.C. seasons

References

English football clubs 1951–52 season
1951-52